The Deadly Awards, commonly known simply as The Deadlys, was an annual celebration of Australian Aboriginal and Torres Strait Islander achievement in music, sport, entertainment and community. The event was held from 1995 to 2013.

Description
The Deadlys were an annual celebration of Aboriginal and Torres Strait Islander achievement in music, sport, entertainment and community.

The word "deadly" is a modern colloquialism used by Aboriginal and Torres Strait Islanders to indicate "great or wonderful".

History
The first Deadlys were held in 1995, at the Boomalli Aboriginal Artists Co-op in the Redfern suburb of Sydney. They stemmed from Boomalli's 1993 Deadly Sounds music and culture radio show, and were driven by Gavin Jones. Over the next few years, their venue shifted through The Metro Theatre, the Hard Rock Café, Home in Darling Harbour, Fox Studios and others. Then 2001 began The Deadlys residency at the Sydney Opera House, from where the annual gala was broadcast by National Indigenous Television.

The Deadly Awards earlier growth continued, along with widening regard as a community and Australian institution. Anchored by their annual event held at the Opera House (hosted by Jones' Vibe Australia), later years added venues in other states. Expansion also happened beyond their original music focus to include sport, entertainment, the arts, health, education and training in the Indigenous Australian community, and candidates began to be nominated and voted on by the public.

The last Deadlys were held in 2013.

Cancellation
In June 2014, the Deadly Awards' funding was cut by the Abbott Government in measures designed to reallocate funding to Indigenous education programs with 2014 Deadly funding phased back to $1 million and no funding provided for future years.

On 12 July, Gavin Jones was found dead. Vibe Australia announced on 14 July 2014 that the 20th edition of the event, due to  be held at the Sydney Opera House on 30 September 2014, would not occur, along with all other Vibe projects, with funds instead "directed to the Australian Government's programs that deliver front line services from 1 July 2014". 

All Vibe projects concluded on 30 June 2014. After a story was run on Triple J's Hack program on 15 July 2014, a groundswell of community support for saving the Deadly Awards began. A petition on Change.org attracted over 26,000 signatures and a Kickstarter campaign reached .

In November 2017, the National Dreamtime Awards were launched to fill the void in recognising Indigenous achievements as a result of the cessation of the Deadly Awards.

See also

 List of television awards
Indigenous Australian music

References

External links

 
Indigenous Australian mass media
Australian television awards
Organisations serving Indigenous Australians
Australian music awards
1995 establishments in Australia
Awards established in 1995
2013 disestablishments in Australia
Awards disestablished in 2013